Moussa Ballo Finigue (born 15 December 1994 in Ivory Coast) is an Ivorian professional footballer who was last attached to Zwekapin United of the Myanmar National League.

Nepal

Recruited by Manang Marsyangdi Club of the Nepalese top division in 2015, commingling with two Ivorians, a Malian, and a Cameroonian, Ballo claimed that the main problem he encountered  in Nepal was that the teams did not honor the terms of the contract.

Was sent off for getting two yellow cards in the final day of the Nepal National League.

References 

1994 births
Expatriate footballers in Nepal
Myanmar National League players
Association football defenders
Expatriate footballers in Myanmar
Living people
Expatriate footballers in Uganda
Zwegabin United F.C. players
Ivorian footballers
Ivorian expatriate footballers
Expatriate footballers in Tanzania
Expatriate footballers in India
Ivorian expatriate sportspeople in India
Ivorian expatriate sportspeople in Myanmar
Ivorian expatriate sportspeople in Uganda
Ivorian expatriate sportspeople in Tanzania